Earthling is a 2010 sci-fi film by Clay Liford starring Rebecca Spence, Peter Greene and William Katt.

Synopsis
After a mysterious atmospheric event, a small group of people wake up to realize that their entire lives have been a lie. They are, in fact, aliens disguised as humans. Now they have to make a choice: live amongst men, or try to find a way home.

Cast
 Rebecca Spence as Judith 
 Peter Greene as Swinnert 
 William Katt as Ryan Donnelly 
 Jennifer Shakeshaft as Joy (as Jennifer Sipes)
 Saxon Sharbino as Young Joy 
 Savanna Sears as Maris 
 Matt Socia as Sean 
 Amelia Turner as Abby
 Gail Cronauer as Isabel

References

External links
 

2010 films
2010s science fiction films
2010s English-language films